The cut, in Prolog, is a goal, written as !, which always succeeds, but cannot be backtracked. Cuts can be used to prevent unwanted backtracking, which could add unwanted solutions and/or space/time overhead to a query.

The cut should be used sparingly. While cuts can be inserted into codes containing errors, if a test is unnecessary because a cut has guaranteed that it is true, it is good practice to say so in a comment at the appropriate place.

Some programmers call the cut a controversial control facility  because it was added for efficiency reasons only and is not a Horn clause.

Types

Green cut 
The use of a cut which only improves efficiency is referred to as a green cut. Green cuts are used to make programs more efficient without changing program output. For example:
 gamble(X) :- gotmoney(X),!.
 gamble(X) :- gotcredit(X), \+ gotmoney(X).
This is called a  cut operator. The ! tells the interpreter to stop looking for alternatives; however, if  fails it will check the second rule. Adding  guarantees that the second rule will always work, even if the first rule is removed by accident, changed, or moved after the second one.

Red cut 
A cut that is not a green cut is referred to as a  cut, for example:
 gamble(X) :- gotmoney(X),!.
 gamble(X) :- gotcredit(X).
Proper placement of the cut operator and the order of the rules are required to determine their logical meaning. If for any reason the first rule is removed (e.g. by a cut-and-paste accident) or moved after the second one, the second rule will be broken, i.e., it will not guarantee the rule .

References 

Logic programming